Giovanni Melis Fois (October 7, 1916 – September 3, 2009) was an Italian Prelate of Roman Catholic Church.

Fois was born in Sorgono, Italy and ordained a priest on August 13, 1939 from the Archidocese of Oristano. On May 25, 1963, he was appointed bishop of the Diocese of Tempio-Ampurias and ordained bishop July 28, 1963. Fois was then appointed to bishop of the Diocese of Nuoro November 1, 1970 where he remained until retirement on April 16, 1992.

See also
Roman Catholic Archdiocese of Pescara-Penne

External links
 Catholic-Hierarchy

1916 births
2009 deaths
People from the Province of Nuoro
20th-century Italian Roman Catholic bishops
Participants in the Second Vatican Council